Informe especial is an investigative television newsmagazine from Chile. The program began in 1984 and, when in season, airs every Thursday night on TVN.

Notable Anchormen
Carlos Pinto (1984–88)
Santiago Pavlovic (2001-)

See also
 Bernardo de la Maza

References

External links
 Profile at 24 Horas

Mass media in Chile